Rail transport in Madhya Pradesh began in the year 1867 when Allahabad–Jabalpur branch line was opened in June 1867. The Etarsi to Jabalpur section was opened on 7 March 1870 by GIPR, linking up with EIR track at Jabalpur from Allahabad, and establishing connectivity between Mumbai and Kolkata. In 1903, with the introduction of Delhi-Chennai rail route through the state and Bhopal Junction railway station, the state got a good rail connectivity. Presently major portion of the state's rail connectivity is provided by the railway zone called West Central Railway.

Railway zones 

The major railway zone of the state is West Central Railways, whose headquarters are at Jabalpur. Besides WCR some part of the state is served by WR (Western Railway), CR (Central Railway), NCR

Divisions
 Western Railways– 
 West Central Railways –  &

Sub Divisions
The rail route of 7  divisions passes through Madhya Pradesh state, which is the highest in Indian Railways Network for any state.

 Central Railway - Khandwa
 North Central Railway - Gwalior
 East Central Railway - Singrauli
 South East Central Railway - Balaghat
 West Central Railway - Katni
 Western Railway - Indore
 North Western Railway - Nimach

Railway stations
Presently, the state of Madhya Pradesh has more than 723 major and minor railway stations. The  Jabalpur Junction, Bhopal Junction (main railway station of Bhopal) and Bhopal Habibganj (a suburban railway station in Bhopal) are considered as the best railway stations of M. P. with several passenger facilities.
Besides these railway stations, Indore Junction, Gwalior Junction, Itarsi Junction, Satna Junction, Katni Junction, Sehore and Khajuraho railway stations are considered to be the "Adarsh Railway Station" or "Ideal" railway stations. These ideal railway stations are provided with all the common passenger facilities.
Some major cities in Madhya Pradesh have more than one railway stations. For instance, Indore, the major city and commercial capital of the state has more than 11 local railway stations such as Indore (Main), Lakshmibai Nagar, Rajendra Nagar, Lokmanya Nagar, Gwalior has 7 local stations and bhopal has 5 local railway stations.

Railway junctions
The following are the 13 major junction railway stations in Madhya Pradesh :-

Upcoming railway stations

 Karera
 Kannod
 Chhapra
 Alirajpur railway station 
 Jhabua railway station 
 Dinara
 Khategao
 Pithampur 
 Seodha
 Dhar
 Rajgarh 
 Narsinghgarh
 Chanderi

Upcoming railway junctions

 Gadarwara 
 Budni 
 Biyaora 
 Rau 
 Mangalia gaon 
 Rayaru
 Shivpuri
 Seopur

See also
Bhopal Shatabdi
Indore Duronto
Madhya Pradesh Sampark Kranti
Bhopal Express

References